Cowgill's law, named after Indo-Europeanist Warren Cowgill, refers to two unrelated sound changes, one occurring in Proto-Greek and the other in Proto-Germanic.

Cowgill's law in Greek
In Proto-Greek, Cowgill's law says that a former  vowel becomes  between a resonant and a labial consonant (including labiovelars), in either order.

Examples:
  "night" < PIE  (cf. , Ved.  < *nakts, gen. sg.  /nekʷts/)
  "leaf" < PIE  (cf. )
  "mill" < PIE  (cf. )
  "nail" (stem ) < early PG  < PIE  (cf.  < PGerm )

Cowgill's law in Germanic
Cowgill's law in Germanic has no relation to Cowgill's law in Greek other than having been named after the same person. This law is still controversial, although increasingly accepted. Donald Ringe (2006) accepts it; Andrew Sihler (1995) is noncommittal.

Examples are fairly few:
 Proto Germanic  "alive" (whence English quick) < PIE  (cf. )
  "us two" (cf. ) < PIE  (cf. ; Ved.  acc. du. "us two" < )
 Possibly  "husband's brother" < PIE  (cf. , Ved.)

Since Germanic  results from earlier PIE , and since the change occurred before Grimm's law applied (according to Ringe), the resulting change would be actually  > . This would have been more likely if  was a voiced velar obstruent to begin with. If  was a voiced labiovelar fricative as is occasionally suggested, the change would therefore have been:  > .

Notes

References

Indo-European linguistics
Sound laws